Helmut Zanghellini (born 16 December 1939) is a German ice hockey player. He competed in the men's tournament at the 1964 Winter Olympics.

References

External links
 

1939 births
Living people
Olympic ice hockey players of Germany
Olympic ice hockey players of the United Team of Germany
Ice hockey players at the 1964 Winter Olympics
Sportspeople from Füssen